Hell Hath No Fury is the fourth album by American punk rock band Civet. The album was released on September 9, 2008. It was their first release on independent label Hellcat Records. It is the first Civet album featuring  Jacqui Valentine as the band's bassist and the only one featuring Danni Harrowyn.

Track listing

Personnel

Civet
 Liza Graves – Lead vocals, rhythm guitar
 Suzy Homewrecker – Lead guitar, backing vocals
 Jacqui Valentine – Bass guitar, backing vocals
 Danni Harrowyn – Drums, backing vocals

Additional musicians
Tim Armstrong - Additional writing on "All I Want"

Artwork
 Matt Grayson – Album cover photography
 Bree Kristel Clarke – Poster photography
 Time Freeze Studios – Album Artwork

Production
 Julian Raymond – Producer,
 Howard Willing – Producer, mixing, engineer
Kevin Mills - Assistant Engineer
 Robert Vosgien – Mastering

Management
 Laura Jean M. Hyde – Management
 Tom Hoppa – Booking Agent for The Kirby Organization 
 Keith R. Walner – Legal

References

2008 albums
Civet (band) albums
Hellcat Records albums